Maple Ridge Township is a township in Isanti County, Minnesota, United States. The population was 737 at the 2000 census.

Etymology
Maple Ridge Township was named for a ridge and the maple trees within its borders.

Geography
According to the United States Census Bureau, the township has a total area of 35.7 square miles (92.4 km2), of which 35.0 square miles (90.7 km2)  is land and 0.7 square mile (1.7 km2)  (1.88%) is water.

Demographics

As of the census of 2000, there were 737 people, 279 households, and 203 families residing in the township.  The population density was 21.0 people per square mile (8.1/km2). There were 299 housing units at an average density of 8.5/sq mi (3.3/km2). The racial makeup of the township was 96.34% White, 0.14% African American, 1.63% Native American, 0.27% Asian, 1.22% from other races, and 0.41% from two or more races. Hispanic or Latino of any race were 1.76% of the population.

There were 279 households, out of which 33.3% had children under the age of 18 living with them, 60.9% were married couples living together, 6.5% had a female householder with no husband present, and 26.9% were non-families. 21.1% of all households were made up of individuals, and 6.8% had someone living alone who was 65 years of age or older. The average household size was 2.64 and the average family size was 3.10.

In the township the population was spread out, with 26.3% under the age of 18, 7.3% from 18 to 24, 29.6% from 25 to 44, 26.1% from 45 to 64, and 10.7% who were 65 years of age or older. The median age was 38 years. For every 100 females, there were 107.0 males. For every 100 females age 18 and over, there were 109.7 males.

The median income for a household in the township was $39,688, and the median income for a family was $47,500. Males had a median income of $35,750 versus $29,688 for females. The per capita income for the township was $18,468. About 3.4% of families and 4.5% of the population were below the poverty line, including 3.6% of those under age 18 and 8.1% of those age 65 or over.

References

Townships in Isanti County, Minnesota
Townships in Minnesota